Miroslav Neušel (born 5 February 1996) is a Slovak footballer who currently plays for MFK Dukla Banská Bystrica as a midfielder.

Club career

FK Dukla Banská Bystrica
Neušel made his Fortuna Liga debut for Dukla Banská Bystrica on 18 October 2014 against Spartak Myjava.

References

External links
 Eurofotbal profile
 
 Futbalnet profile

1996 births
Living people
Slovak footballers
Association football midfielders
FK Dukla Banská Bystrica players
Slovak Super Liga players
People from Revúca
Sportspeople from the Banská Bystrica Region